Zuvanda is a genus of flowering plants belonging to the family Brassicaceae.

Its native range is Eastern Mediterranean to Iran and Arabian Peninsula.

Species:
 Zuvanda crenulata (DC.) Askerova 
 Zuvanda exacoides (DC.) Askerova 
 Zuvanda meyeri (Boiss.) Askerova

References

Brassicaceae
Brassicaceae genera